West Virginia Route 4 is a north–south state highway within and maintained by the U.S. state of West Virginia. The southern terminus is at U.S. Route 119 in Clendenin.  The northern terminus of the route is at West Virginia Route 20 in Rock Cave.

The road connects several towns in the central part of the state. WV 4 is concurrent with U.S. Route 19 from Flatwoods to Ireland.

WV 4 used to extend across the state, running west from Clendenin to Kentucky via US 119 and US 60, and north and east from Rock Cave to Virginia via WV 20, US 33, WV 28, and US 50.

Major intersections

References

004
West Virginia Route 004
West Virginia Route 004
West Virginia Route 004
West Virginia Route 004
West Virginia Route 004